Box Hill railway station is located on the Lilydale and Belgrave lines in Victoria, Australia. It serves the eastern Melbourne suburb of Box Hill, and opened on 1 December 1882.

The station is located beneath the Box Hill Central Shopping Centre. East of the station, towards Lilydale and Belgrave, the three tracks merge into two.

History
Box Hill station opened on 1 December 1882, when the railway line from Camberwell was extended to Lilydale. Like the suburb itself, the station was named after Box Hill in Surrey, England, which was the birthplace of a local postmaster.

When the station opened, Box Hill was a separate town with several hundred residents. In 1895, a large market was opened next to the station. On 19 December 1922, the section from Flinders Street to Box Hill was electrified, which was continued to Ringwood the following month.

In 1971, the current centre line between East Camberwell and Box Hill was provided. It was also in that year that the overpass over Elgar Road was opened, located in the up direction from the station, replacing a level crossing.

On 29 December 1976, goods services to and from the station ceased.

In 1979, the station was one of three used as trial sites for new bike lockers under the Melbourne Bicycle Strategy, either for occasional, monthly or quarterly hire.

Beginning in early 1983, construction started on rebuilding the station, as part of the project to eliminate the level crossing at Station Street (formerly located at the down end of the station). Box Hill Central Shopping Centre and the bus terminus were built over the top of the station, with the complex being completed in 1985. Platform 1 was used between 24 April 1983 and 9 June 1984, while the current station was being built, and has been retained for possible future use. The platform has no track or lighting, with a McDonald's Restaurant since built over the ramp from the station concourse.

On 18 July 1996, Box Hill was upgraded to a Premium Station.

During January 2007, the line was closed between Box Hill and Blackburn, to facilitate grade separation works at the Middleborough Road level crossing, near Laburnum. Buses operated between the two stations for the duration and, to cater for that, a temporary bus interchange was constructed at Box Hill. The interchange was built directly on top of the tracks, which had been paved between the rails to the east of the station, and was connected to Platforms 2 and 3 via a raised walkway. With the completion of the major works at the end of January 2007, the bus interchange was removed.

During the 2017/2018 financial year, Box Hill was the tenth-busiest station on Melbourne's metropolitan network, as well as being the busiest non-interchange station outside of Melbourne's CBD, with 3.254 million passenger movements.

Box Hill will be the northern terminus of stage one of the Suburban Rail Loop project. Construction is set to begin in 2022, with the project scheduled to be completed by 2032. This will connect Box Hill to the Frankston, Pakenham, Cranbourne and Glen Waverley lines, as well as other new intermediate stations. Stage two of the project will involve the line extending northwards to Doncaster, and eventually to Bundoora, Reservoir, Fawkner, Broadmeadows, Melbourne Airport, Sunshine and Werribee.

Platforms and services
Box Hill has one island platform with two faces and two side platforms, however Platform 1 is not in use. The station is served by Lilydale and Belgrave line trains.

Platform 1:
 Unused and has no track, with a McDonald's Restaurant built over its entrance.

Platform 2:
  all stations and limited express services to Flinders Street
  all stations and limited express services to Flinders Street

Platform 3:
  all stations and limited express services to Lilydale
  all stations and limited express services to Belgrave
  all stations and limited express services to Flinders Street
  all stations and limited express services to Flinders Street

Platform 4:
  weekday all stations and limited express services to Lilydale; weekday all stations and limited express services to Blackburn
  weekday all stations and limited express services to Belgrave; weekday all stations and limited express services to Blackburn

Transport links

Bus services
A sheltered thirteen-bay bus terminus is located on the rooftop of the Box Hill Central Shopping Centre, two levels above the station. The terminus serves 20 bus routes operated by CDC Melbourne, Kinetic Melbourne and Ventura Bus Lines. The bus deck originally had 14 bus bays, but bay 12 was removed around 2015 to enable safer access to the elevator located in the office suites. In 2018, the position of bays 2 and 3 were swapped so that passengers queuing to board SmartBus route 903 southbound would not be in the way of the food kiosk.

Bus routes serving Box Hill station:
Bay 1:
  : to Altona station via Westfield Doncaster, Heidelberg station, Preston station, Coburg station, Essendon station and Sunshine station

Bay 2:
  : to Mordialloc via Chadstone Shopping Centre, Oakleigh station and Mentone station

Bay 3:
 : to Ringwood station via Park Orchards

Bay 4:
 : to Westfield Doncaster/Templestowe via Middleborough Road
 : to Doncaster Park and Ride via Union Road

Bay 5:
 : to Templestowe via Westfield Doncaster
 : to Greensborough station via Westfield Doncaster

Bay 6:
 : to Melbourne CBD (Lonsdale Street) via Belmore Road and the Eastern Freeway

Bay 7:
 : to Chadstone Shopping Centre via Surrey Hills station, Camberwell station and Glen Iris station

Bay 8:
 : to Mitcham station via Blackburn North

Bay 9:
 : to Nunawading station via Station Street, Eley Road and Fulton Road

Bay 10:
 : to Mitcham station via Blackburn station, Forest Hill Chase and Brentford Square
 : to Burwood via Surrey Hills station

Bay 11:
 : to Oakleigh station via Mount Waverley station, Monash University Clayton Campus and Clayton station

Bay 13:
 : to Deakin University Burwood Campus via Elgar Road
 : to Upper Ferntree Gully station via Vermont South, Westfield Knox and Mountain Gate Shopping Centre

Bay 14:
 : to Deakin University Burwood Campus
 : to Westfield Southland via Deakin University and Chadstone Shopping Centre
 : to Deakin University Burwood Campus via Station Street and Canterbury Road

Tram services
Yarra Trams operates one route via Box Hill station:
 : Box Hill – Port Melbourne

Gallery

References

External links
 
 Melway map at street-directory.com.au

Premium Melbourne railway stations
Railway stations located underground in Melbourne
Railway stations in Australia opened in 1882
Railway stations in the City of Whitehorse